Cleare is a surname. Notable people with the surname include:

 Aaron Cleare (born 1983), Bahamian athlete
 Ann Cleare (born 1983), Irish composer
 Cordell Cleare (born 1965), American activist and politician

See also
 Clear (disambiguation)
 Cleere, a surname
 Clere, a surname